Oliva carneola, common name the carnelian olive, is a species of sea snail, a marine gastropod mollusk in the family Olividae, the olives.

Description
This is a small species, ranging from 10–28 mm. The spire is low and the shell has a relatively squat appearance. Typical shells are mostly orange, yellow, or russet with lighter bands. Some forms may feature patterning like that found on many other olive species.

Distribution
This species is found in the Indo-Pacific region, including the Philippines, Indonesia, Micronesia, and Polynesia.

References

External links

carneola
Gastropods described in 1791